Mohamed Taghiyoullah Abderrahmane Denna (born 15 June 1986), known as Taghiyoulla Denna, is Mauritanian professional footballer who plays as a defensive midfielder and defender for ASC Tevragh-Zeina in the Mauritanean Premier League.

International career

International goals
Scores and results list Mauritania's goal tally first.

References 

Mauritanian footballers
1986 births
Living people
People from Dakhlet Nouadhibou Region
Association football defenders 
Association football midfielders

FC Tevragh-Zeina players
Mauritania international footballers
Mauritania A' international footballers
2014 African Nations Championship players